"Quiet Storm" is the first single from Mobb Deep's fourth album Murda Muzik. The song was originally released on the soundtrack for the film In Too Deep. The song features a sample of the bass line from the classic hip-hop song "White Lines (Don't Do It)" by Grandmaster Flash & The Furious Five and another sample from Smokey Robinson's "A Quiet Storm". In 2001, the R&B group 112 used an updated version of the "Quiet Storm" beat for their number-one single, "It's Over Now".

A remix featuring Lil' Kim was released as the album's second single. The remix also became very popular and is noted to be one of Lil' Kim's most memorable guest appearances.

Track listing
Side A
"Quiet Storm" [Dirty Version]
"Quiet Storm" [Instrumental]

Side B
"Quiet Storm" [Clean Version]
"Quiet Storm" [Acappella]

Remix
A remix of "Quiet Storm" (co-produced by Jonathan "Lighty" Williams) was released shortly after the release of the single. The remix features Lil' Kim, who used her guest verse to diss rapper Foxy Brown. The B-side features the song "It's Mine", which was released as the next single from the album.

Throughout her career, Lil' Kim has performed the remix of "Quiet Storm" at various high-profile venues, including at Hot97's Hot for the Holidays concert and the 2019 BET Hip-Hop Awards. Lil' Kim performs a dance routine during the chorus of the remix which has gone viral multiple times, and which has become known to many as the "Lil' Kim Dance."

Track listing
Side A
"Quiet Storm" (remix) (clean version)
"Quiet Storm" (remix) (dirty version)

Side B
"It's Mine" (clean version)
"It's Mine" (dirty version)

Charts

Weekly charts

Year-end charts

References

External links
Music video

1999 songs
Song recordings produced by Havoc (musician)
Songs written by Havoc (musician)
Songs written by Prodigy (rapper)
Mobb Deep songs
Lil' Kim songs
Hardcore hip hop songs
Music videos directed by Hype Williams
Music videos directed by Joseph Kahn
Loud Records singles
Gangsta rap songs
Songs written by Smokey Robinson
Songs written by Melle Mel